William Dean (born ca. 1882 in Australia; date of death unknown) was an Australian born English cricketer who represented Hampshire in one first-class match in 1907 against the touring South Africans. Dean took two wickets in the South Africans second innings, dismissing William Shalders LBW and Aubrey Faulkner caught and bowled.

External links
William Dean at Cricinfo
William Dean at CricketArchive

English cricketers
Hampshire cricketers
1880s births
Year of birth uncertain
Year of death missing